Eric De Doncker (born 12 March 1962, in Brussels) is a Belgian racing driver. He won the (inaugural) GT4 European Cup in 2007 and again in 2008 with a Ford Mustang, and in 2008–2009 competed in the GT4 as well as the GT3 European Championship. He again competed in GT3 racing in 2009–10 (with a Ford GT) and 2010–11 (in a Mustang). He won the Group C Racing Series Championship 2016.

Complete motorsports results

NASCAR
(key) (Bold – Pole position awarded by qualifying time. Italics – Pole position earned by points standings or practice time. * – Most laps led.)

Whelen Euro Series – Elite 1

Whelen Euro Series – Elite 2

24 Hours of Le Mans results

References

External links
 Profile at driverdb.com

1968 births
Living people
Belgian racing drivers
FIA GT Championship drivers
British GT Championship drivers
24 Hours of Spa drivers
Racing drivers from Brussels

Multimatic Motorsports drivers
Le Mans Cup drivers
NASCAR drivers
GT4 European Series drivers